A number of steamships have been named Slavonia, including –

, a Cunard Line passenger ship in service 1903–09
, a Hamburg Amerika Line passenger ship in service 1886–97
, a Hamburg Amerika Line ship in service 1904–19

See also
 Slavonia (disambiguation)

Ship names